Candy Girl may refer to:

Music 
 Barbara Hetmańska or Candy Girl, Polish singer
 "Candy Girl" (The Four Seasons song)
 Candy Girl (album), an album by New Edition
 "Candy Girl" (New Edition song)
 "Candy Girl" (Mika Nakashima song)
 "Candy Girl", a song by Babybird from Ugly Beautiful
 "Candy Girl", a mixtape by Lil' Brianna
 "Candy Girl", a song by hitomi
 "Candy Girl", a song by Low from Trust
 "Candy Girl", a song by Miki Furukawa
 "Candygirl", a song by Sweetbox from Sweetbox

Other uses 
 Candy Girl: A Year in the Life of an Unlikely Stripper, a memoir by Diablo Cody
 Candy Girls, a 2009 American reality TV series that aired on E!
 CandyGirl, a line of sex dolls manufactured in Japan